Cherry Hill is the name of some populated places in the U.S. state of Virginia:
Cherry Hill, Prince William County, Virginia
Cherry Hill, Roanoke, Virginia